Muhammad ibn Sa'id ibn al-Sarh al-Kinani, alternatively given as Sa'id ibn Sarh, was a ninth century governor of the Yemen for the Abbasid Caliphate.

A member of the ahl Filastin ("people of Palestine"), Ibn al-Sarh was appointed to the Yemen during the caliphate of al-Amin (r. 809–813). Although little is known of his administration, by the time he left office he had accumulated a large amount of wealth, which he took with him when he departed from the province during the Fourth Fitna. He then returned to Palestine, and is subsequently mentioned as seizing control of al-Ramlah during the chaos of the Fitna.

Notes

References 
 
 
 
 
 
 
 

Abbasid governors of Yemen
9th-century people from the Abbasid Caliphate
9th-century Arabs